Two major human polls make up the 2022 NCAA Division I men's soccer rankings: United Soccer Coaches and Top Drawer Soccer.

Legend

United Soccer Coaches 

Source:

Top Drawer Soccer 

Source:

References

Rankings
College men's soccer rankings in the United States